MAHRU & AHRA are humanoid robots design and developed by KIST. Unlike other robots such as ASIMO, they can obtain artificial intelligence from certain networks. They made public appearances around in South Korea.

Features and technology

Form
MAHRU & AHRA stand at 150 cm and weigh 67 kg. They are powered by a lithium polymer battery (model 48V-20A) and networks. The colors are blue (for MAHRU), orange (for AHRA).

Abilities
MAHRU & AHRA can recognize moving objects, postures, gestures, its surrounding environment, sounds and faces. They can walk anyway, such as right, left, backward, or forward.

Specifications

Models

MAHRU-1
MAHRU-2
MAHRU-M
MAHRU-R
MAHRU-Z, updated to rotate its head, arms, legs, having six fingers, and a 3D camera.

References

External links

Bipedal humanoid robots
Robots of South Korea
2005 robots